Douglas Leon Eddings (born September 14, 1968) is an American professional umpire in Major League Baseball.

Umpiring style
A report in The Hardball Times listed Eddings as having called the largest strike zone among all Major League umpires in 2011.

Career 
Eddings started umpiring Little League games at 14, and in his early career, worked throughout the minor leagues. He started working American League games in 1998, and has worked throughout both major leagues since 2000. In the postseason, Eddings has worked the 2000 ALDS, 2002 ALDS, 2005 ALCS, 2014 NL Wild Card Game, 2018 NLDS, the 2019 NLDS, the 2019 World Series the 2020 National League Wild Card Series, the 2020 NLDS, the 2021 NLDS, the 2022 AL Wild Card Series and the 2022 NLCS. He also worked the 2004 All-Star Game and was the replay official for the 2017 All-Star Game. He wears uniform number 88.

Notable games
Eddings was the home plate umpire for Cal Ripken Jr.'s final major league game on October 6, 2001. He was the second base umpire for the game between the San Francisco Giants and the San Diego Padres on August 4, 2007, at San Diego when Barry Bonds tied Hank Aaron for first place on Major League Baseball's career home run list by hitting his 755th career home run. He was the home plate umpire for Carlos Rodon's no-hitter thrown on April 14, 2021. 

Eddings was the home plate umpire for Game 2 of the 2005 ALCS between the White Sox and the Angels. White Sox batter A. J. Pierzynski quickly got two strikes and then swung at the third pitch, a splitter which came in very low. Angels catcher Josh Paul caught the ball so "thought the inning was over." Not hearing himself called out, Pierzynski took a couple of steps toward the dugout, then turned and ran to first base while most of the Angels were walking off the field. Eddings ruled that the ball had not been legally caught (an uncaught third strike), but made no audible call that the ball hit the ground. Joe Buck and Tim McCarver, announcing the game on Fox and reviewing replays of the pitch, felt the ball had clearly been caught; note that MLB did not adopt review via instant replay until the  season. A pinch runner for Pierzynski subsequently scored the winning run of the game for the White Sox. According to umpire supervisor Rich Rieker, the replays showed "there was definitely a change in direction there" indicating the ball touched the ground and felt, at best, the replay was inconclusive. After the game, Eddings said he would adjust his umpiring style to clarify a third strike call from calling the batter out.

See also 
 List of Major League Baseball umpires

References

Further reading

External links

Major League Baseball profile
Retrosheet

1968 births
Living people
Major League Baseball umpires
People from Las Cruces, New Mexico
Sportspeople from New Mexico